Frydman is a village in the administrative district of Gmina Łapsze Niżne, within Nowy Targ County, Lesser Poland Voivodeship, in southern Poland, close to the border with Slovakia.

The village has a population of 1,600.

It is one of the 14 villages in the Polish part of the historical region of Spiš (Polish: Spisz). It was first mentioned in a written document in 1320 (terram Fridmanvagasa).

References 

Villages in Nowy Targ County
Spiš
Kraków Voivodeship (1919–1939)